Dong Zhiyuan (Chinese: 董志远; pinyin: Dǒng Zhìyuǎn; born 16 March 1989) is a former Chinese footballer who played as a forward for Chinese club Dalian LFTZ Huayi.

Club career
Dong joined Wuhan Optics Valley youth team in 2003 and was promoted to the first team squad in 2008. After Wuhan Optics Valley decided to exit 2008 Chinese Super League and disbanded, Dong entered Hubei Luyin.

In 2012, Dong joined newly founded  League Two club Hubei China-Kyle (later Xinjiang Tianshan Leopard), and scored a critical goal to help the team gain promotion into League One.

In 2016, China League Two club Hebei Elite signed Dong.

On 13 January 2017, Dalian Transcendence signed a 5 year contract with Dong.

On 28 February 2019, Dong transferred to China League Two side Dalian Chanjoy.

Career statistics 
As of 31 December 2020.

References

External links
Player profile at sodasoccer.com
 

1989 births
Living people
Chinese footballers
Association football forwards
Footballers from Dalian
Wuhan Guanggu players
Wuhan F.C. players
Xinjiang Tianshan Leopard F.C. players
Dalian Transcendence F.C. players
Chinese Super League players
China League One players
Guangxi Pingguo Haliao F.C. players